Mesocrambus candiellus is a species of moth in the family Crambidae described by Gottlieb August Wilhelm Herrich-Schäffer in 1848. It is found in Portugal, Spain, Italy, on the Balkan Peninsula and in Russia, Asia Minor and Syria.

References

Moths described in 1848
Crambinae
Moths of Europe